Bhawpal or sometime pronounced Bhopal, are a Rajput clan that form part of group of tribes that form the Chibhali community. They are found mainly in a region known as Chibhal, that lies on the southern slopes of the Shivalik hills between the Chenab and Jhelum rivers, in the Jammu and Kashmir State.

History and origin

Dharam Chand Chib, the Hindu Raja of the area converted to Islam in the 15th Century. As a result of his conversion, many other Rajput clans converted to Islam. The Bhawpal, like other Chibhali claims descent from the Katoch Rajputs of Kangra, in what is now Himachal Pradesh, India.

Distribution

In Pakistani Kashmir, they are found mainly in Kotli District and Bagh District, in villages near the line of control. In Indian administered Jammu & Kashmir, they are found in Rajauri, Nawshera and Jammu tehsils.
They are also Sikh Bhopals found in the Punjab region, mainly in the Jalandhar district

See also
Muslim Rajput
Ethnic groups of Azad Kashmir

References

Rajput clans
Social groups of Jammu and Kashmir